Chappel Island is the largest of the Donovan Islands, lying about  northwest of Clark Peninsula in the eastern part of Vincennes Bay. The island has a number of large Adélie penguin rookeries. It was first mapped from air photos taken by U.S. Navy Operation Highjump, 1946–47, and named by the Advisory Committee on Antarctic Names for Chief Warrant Officer R.L. Chappel, United States Marine Corps, motion picture officer on Operation Highjump photographic flights in this area and other coastal areas between 14 and 164 east longitude.

See also 
 Composite Antarctic Gazetteer
 List of Antarctic islands south of 60° S
 Scientific Committee on Antarctic Research
 Territorial claims in Antarctica

References 

Islands of Wilkes Land